Katherine Jean "Kate" Ross (June 21, 1956 – March 12, 1998) was an American mystery author who wrote four books set in Regency-era England about the dandy Julian Kestrel.

Works
The novels are:
 Cut to the Quick (1994), which won the 1994 Gargoyle award for in the category of Best Historical Mystery
 A Broken Vessel (1995)
 Whom the Gods Love (1996)
 The Devil in Music (1997), which won the 1997 Agatha Award for in the category of Best Novel.The Lullaby Cheat (1997), a short story featuring Kestrel, is included in the mystery anthology Crime Through Time, edited by Miriam Grace Monfredo and Sharan Newman.

Her short story, The Unkindest Cut, was published in the 1998 anthology Past Poisons: An Ellis Peters Memorial Anthology of Historical Crime.

Education
The daughter of Mr. and Mrs. Edward A. Ross, Kate Ross attended Wellesley College and Yale Law School. A trial lawyer, she worked at Sullivan & Worcester (a Boston law firm) until 1981. She then began her career as a novelist.

Death
Ross died of breast cancer in 1998 at the age of 41, and is interred in Wellesley, Massachusetts.

See also
List of female detective/mystery writers

References

External links
 Mystery Book Awards, littlemoon.com; accessed December 9, 2014.

1956 births
1998 deaths
Agatha Award winners
American mystery writers
Place of birth missing
Place of death missing
Wellesley College alumni
Yale Law School alumni
20th-century American novelists
20th-century American lawyers
American women novelists
Women mystery writers
20th-century American women writers
20th-century American women lawyers